The 1951 IFA Shield Final was the 59th final of the IFA Shield, the second oldest football competition in India, and was contested between Kolkata giants East Bengal and Mohun Bagan on 11 September 1951 first which ended in a draw and then a replay on 18 September 1951 at the East Bengal–Mohun Bagan Ground in Kolkata.

East Bengal won the final 2–0 to claim their 5th IFA Shield title. P. B. A. Saleh scored both the goals in the replay final as East Bengal lifted their fifth IFA Shield title.

Route to the final

Match

Summary
The IFA Shield final began at the East Bengal-Mohun Bagan Ground in Kolkata on 11 September 1951 in front of a packed crowd as Kolkata giants East Bengal and Mohun Bagan faced each other in a Kolkata Derby. East Bengal, the two-time defending champions, reached their eighth final after defeating Rajasthan 3–0 in the semi-final, having won the title four times in 1943, 1945, 1949, and 1950. Mohun Bagan also made their eighth appearance in the final after they defeated another Kolkata giant Mohammedan Sporting 4–0 in the semi-final, having won it thrice previously in 1911, 1947, and 1948. 

East Bengal started as the favorites as the two-time defending champions and with a star-studded forward line consisting of the famous Pancha Pandavas. However, Mohun Bagan got the best chance of the match in the tenth minute of the game when Runu Guha Thakurta played Babu open on goal but the latter missed his chance from five yards. Rabi Das too missed another chance in the twelfth minute after failing to control the ball. East Bengal managed to make a few moves but was denied by Mohun Bagan custodian C. Banerjee. Both teams failed to break the deadlock and the game ended in a 0–0 draw.

Details

Replay

Summary
The replay final began at the East Bengal-Mohun Bagan Ground in Kolkata on 18 September 1951 after the first game ended in a 0–0 stalemate.

East Bengal made a fast start and scored early just in the second minute after P. B. A. Saleh latched onto a pass from K. P. Dhanraj and found the net with a powerful strike to make it 1–0. Mohun Bagan tried to make a comeback in the match but was denied by the East Bengal defense. East Bengal doubled their lead in the nineteenth minute of the match after Saleh once again found himself at the end of a cross from Pansanttom Venkatesh and finished from close range to make it 2–0 before halftime. In the second half, Mohun Bagan created a few chances but East Bengal custodian Manilal Ghatak was able to keep a clean sheet as East Bengal emerged victorious to lift their fifth IFA Shield title, and thus become the first Indian team to lift the title three consecutive times. British regimental teams Gordon Highlanders (1908–10), Calcutta (1922–24), and Sherwood Foresters (1926–28) had achieved this feat previously.

Details

References

External links
IFA Shield Finals

IFA Shield finals
1951–52 in Indian football
East Bengal Club matches
Mohun Bagan AC matches
Football competitions in Kolkata